Jaroslav Otevřel (born September 16, 1968) is a Czech former professional ice hockey left winger. He was drafted in the seventh round, 133rd overall, by the San Jose Sharks in the 1991 NHL Entry Draft. He played 16 games in the National Hockey League (NHL) with the Sharks over two seasons, scoring three goals and four assists.

After career in North America, Otevřel joined Ässät of SM-liiga.

His career ended on February 11, 1996, when he was paralyzed in the game against JYP. He hit the skates of another JYP player slightly, fell and was then hit accidentally to the head by Vitali Karamnov's thigh.

His number 89 was later retired by Ässät. According to his wish, the number is not hanging from the rafters.

He lives in his hometown Zlín, Czech Republic, with his wife and daughter.

Career statistics

Regular season and playoffs

References

External links 
 

1968 births
Living people
Ässät players
Czech ice hockey left wingers
HK Dukla Trenčín players
Ice hockey players with retired numbers
Kansas City Blades players
PSG Berani Zlín players
Sportspeople from Zlín
San Jose Sharks draft picks
San Jose Sharks players
Czechoslovak ice hockey left wingers
Czech expatriate ice hockey players in the United States
Czech expatriate ice hockey players in Finland